Catherine of Lorraine may refer to:

 Catherine of Lorraine, Margravine of Baden-Baden (1407–1439), daughter of Charles II, Duke of Lorraine
 Catherine de Lorraine (1552–1596), daughter of Francis, Duke of Guise and wife of Louis, Duke of Montpensier
 Catherine of Lorraine (1573–1648), daughter of Charles III, Duke of Lorraine, and Abbess of Remiremont
 Catherine de Mayenne (1585–1618), or Catherine de Mayenne-Lorraine-Guise, daughter of Charles, Duke of Mayenne who became Duchess of Mantua by marriage